Skibby is a town , with a population of 3,120 (1 January 2022), situated in Frederikssund Municipality, Region Hovedstaden on the northern part of the island of Zealand (Sjælland) in eastern Denmark. It was the municipal seat of the former Skibby Municipality (Danish, Skibby Kommune), until 1 January 2007.

Skibby Municipality

The former Skibby municipality covered an area of 80 km², and had a total population of 6,783 (2005).

On January 1. 2007 Skibby Municipality ceased to exist as the result of Kommunalreformen ("The Municipality Reform" of 2007).  It was merged with Frederikssund, Jægerspris, and Slangerup municipalities to form the new Frederikssund Municipality.  This created a municipality with an area of 260 km² and a total population of ca. 44,140.

Notable people 
 Hermann Baagøe Storck (1839 in Skibby – 1922 in Copenhagen) a Danish architect and heraldist, known for the restoration of historic buildings. Designed the purpose-built Neoclassical museum building for The Hirschsprung Collection in Copenhagen.
 Sophie Holten (1858 in Skuldelev near Skibby – 1930) a Danish painter who created portraits, flower paintings and genre works, remembered for her portraits of August Strindberg and L. A. Ring

References

External links
Municipality's official website
 Municipal statistics: NetBorger Kommunefakta, delivered from KMD aka Kommunedata (Municipal Data)

Former municipalities of Denmark
Cities and towns in the Capital Region of Denmark
Frederikssund Municipality